The BMW 269, also known as the BMW F269, is an open-wheel Formula 2 race car. It was designed, developed and built by Lola Cars for BMW to participate in the 1969 and 1970 Formula 2 European Championships, as well as the 1969 Formula One World Championship, where it competed in the 1969 German Grand Prix.

Description
The need for BMW to develop an additional single-seater to confirm the growth period in Formula 2, prompted the Bavarian house to build, always supported by Lola, an evolution of the already used Lola T102. The car was therefore designed in 1969 by Len Terry, the single-seaters were partially built by Lola and assembled by BMW itself to be then used mainly in Formula 2 competitions. The engine was a BMW M12 from  4-cylinder in-line with an output of approx  delivered @ 10,700 rpm.

Racing history
The BMW 269 made its first appearance in Formula 2 during the 1969 Madrid Grand Prix, where, however, due to technical problems, it was not used by Hubert Hahne who had to start with the reserve T102. In Austria at Tulln, Hahne himself finished seventh, sanctioning the best result of the season for the single-seater in Formula 2. With the possibility of being able to field even lower category cars in the home Grand Prix of the Nürburgring, the car was also used in Formula 1 and BMW lined up three cars with Hubert Hahne, Gerhard Mitter and Dieter Quester. During Friday's free practice at the German Grand Prix, Mitter went off the track and crashed into the barriers, and was killed instantly. The accident forced the Bavarian team to withdraw from the race. After this brief interlude in the top motorsport championship, the 269 driven by Hahne, Jo Siffert and Quester continued the Formula 2 season with 4 retirements, without being able to score any points. The beginning of 1970 saw the car conquer the first points finishes, with Hahne who, after failing to qualify at Thruxton, finished fourth overall at Hockenheim, and with Questerwho after retiring in Germany, where he had also set the fastest lap, finished fifth in Barcelona. The car's first victory came with Hahne on 14 June at Hockenheim, in the untitled race of the Rhine Cup. The rest of the season, however, was anonymous for the car that with a series of withdrawals due to accidents and mechanical problems will no longer be able to score useful results for the team which will see, more and more frequently, prefer to field the definitive evolution of the single-seater, the BMW 270, which will make BMW gain affirmed competitiveness with the first, then with the retirement of the house become the last, successes in Formula 2.

References

Lola Formula One cars
Formula Two cars
BMW racing cars
BMW in Formula One